Carpigiani is an Italian company, located near Bologna, specialising in the production of gelato and ice cream machines. It has approximately 35% of the global market share, which includes both machines for the production of Italian artisan gelato and those for the production of soft serve gelato and ice cream.

History 
Brothers Bruto and Poerio Carlo Carpigiani created the "Gastecnica S.a.s dei fratelli Carpigiani" in 1944. Carpigiani produced and patented a gelato machine, named "Autogelatiera". The Carpigiani soft serve ice cream machines make a fluffy, whippy ice cream due to their clever whipping action, mixing air and ice cream mix, during the ice cream making process.

The technological growth in the 1960s brought Carpigiani to become the worldwide leader in ice cream machinery, with the invention of the "hard-o-matic".

In 1964 an American secondary company was founded with the name Coldelite U.S.A. and in 1971 Carpigiani bought Cattabriga (concurrent firm). In 1989 the Comenda Ali S.p.A. group bought the Carpigiani Bruto S.p.A., now become Carpigiani Group - Ali Group S.r.l.
In 1993 Carpagiani was certified UNI EN ISO 9001:1987. It was the first company in the business to receive this certification.

The company has branches in France, Germany, the Netherlands, United Kingdom, United States, Japan, China, Singapore, Russia and two in South America. Production plants are located in Bologna, including the headquarters in Anzola dell'Emilia, in Forlì, in Gandia and in Zhongshan. In the 1990s, the Swiss Ott-Freezer, the Promag of Milan, the Spanish Sencotel and the Italian GBG were acquired.

In 2003 the Carpigiani Gelato University was founded, a professional training school on the production of artisan gelato. By 2021 the school, which has established itself as the largest and most prestigious gelato school in the world, has 20 campuses around the globe  in addition to the headquarters in Anzola, where lessons are held in Italian, English and French.

On 27 September 2012, the Carpigiani Gelato Museum was inaugurated, the first and only museum in the world entirely dedicated to gelato.

See also

List of Italian companies

References

External links
Official Website
UK Official Website

Food and drink companies of Italy
Manufacturing companies based in Bologna
Italian brands
Manufacturing companies established in 1946
Italian companies established in 1946
Ice cream